This is a list of Surinamese Hoofdklasse top scorers, that enumerates all players that have finished a season as top goalscorers in the top level of the Surinamese football league system from 1914 (the year that the first championship was disputed) to date.

Top scorers by year

Below is the incomplete list of topscorers from 1964 to date:

Records
Robert "Muis" Lawrence (Laurens) previously held the record for scoring the most goals in a single calendar year, with 30 in the 1998–99 season, but that long-standing record was broken in the 2018–19 season by Renzo Akrosie from Sportvereniging Nationaal Leger (SNL) with 33 goals.

See also
 Surinamese Footballer of the Year

References

External links
RSSSF: List of Top scorers - Suriname

 
Suriname
Association football player non-biographical articles